Yamuna Srinidhi is an Indian Bharatanatyam dancer, choreographer and actress who works in Kannada films and serials. She is also a social worker and NCC volunteer.

Career
Yamuna Srinidhi, initially an Bharatanatyam dancer, has undergone her Bharathanatyam training from various Bharathanatyam gurus for various styles and has taught dance to almost 700 students in USA. After leading a life in USA for 15 years as a Classical Bharathanatyam dancer, choreographer and a cultural torchbearer, Yamuna moved back to India in 2012. Later she started her acting career through the Kannada serial Ashwini Nakshatra. She has acted in more than 20 movies with the leading actors of Kannada industry. She has also acted in more than 10 serials.

Personal life
Yamuna is married and has a son and daughter.

Other works
In 2019, Yamuna canvased for BJP candidate Pratap Simha at Ganesh Nagar in N.R. Constituency in Bengaluru. and also she was appointed as cultural ambassador for Navika Kannada Convention. She teaches dance to the financially under privileged kids in the rural areas. She has won the Karnataka Women Achiever's Award in 2018. In 2019, she spread awareness regarding the bread cancer issues. In 2021, She registered for the donation of her eyesight and she also distributed ration kits to the needy employees of Mysuru Zoo.

Television
Serials

Reality Shows

Web Series

Filmography

References

External links

Living people
Kannada actresses
Actresses in Kannada cinema
Actresses in Kannada television
Year of birth missing (living people)